Harpalus pensylvanicus is a species of ground beetle in the subfamily Harpalinae. It is found throughout North America. It was described by Degeer in 1774.

The adults of the species are shiny black on the top, reddish brown underneath, and the elytra have lines. The larvae are black with a reddish head and the body is tapered with two long cerci. The species' food includes the seeds of ragweed and assorted grasses. They are important weed seed predators. They prefer small seeds such as lamb's quarter and waterhemp seeds. They favor high hayfields opposed to low maize fields. The species occasionally damages ripening strawberries which is probably how it gets water. It is attracted to lights. The common name of the species is Pennsylvania ground beetle.

References

pensylvanicus
Beetles described in 1774
Taxa named by Charles De Geer